Dalian Port (PDA) Company Limited is port operator of Port of Dalian, Dalian, Liaoning, China. It provides container loading and discharging services, storage services for crude oil, refined oil and liquefied chemicals, container logistics services and the operation of container depots, warehouses, shipping agencies and cargo forwarders and a bonded logistics park.

The company was established in 2005. It was listed on the Hong Kong Stock Exchange in 2006 with its IPO price of HK$2.575 per share. It received the retail portion of its IPO with 851 times oversubscribed and the institutional tranche with 90 times oversubscribed.

See others
Port of Dalian

References

External links
PDA Corporation 
Dalian Port (PDA) Company Limited 

Companies listed on the Hong Kong Stock Exchange
Government-owned companies of China
Transport companies established in 2005
Companies based in Dalian
Port operating companies
Logistics companies of China
H shares
2005 establishments in China